Hawaiian literature has its origins in Polynesian mythology. It was originally preserved and expanded solely through oral traditions, as the ancient Hawaiians never developed a writing system. Written literature in the Hawaiian language and literary works in other languages by authors resident in Hawaii did not appear until the nineteenth century, when the arrival of American missionaries introduced the English language, the Latin alphabet, and Western notions of composition to the kingdom.

The earliest compilations of traditional Hawaiian writing were made by John Papa ʻĪʻī, Samuel Kamakau, Kepelino Keauokalani, and David Malo. They were succeeded by King Kalākaua, Martha Beckwith, Abraham Fornander, and William Drake Westervelt, all of whom produced later collections retelling or adapting Hawaii's oral histories.

Other noted authors whose works feature Hawaiian settings and themes, or who were temporarily resident in Hawaii, include Herman Melville, Mark Twain, Robert Louis Stevenson, and Jack London. Detective novelist Earl Derr Biggers is remembered chiefly for his books set in early twentieth century Honolulu, whose protagonist is Chinese-Hawaiian detective Charlie Chan.

Hawaiian literature in the latter half of the twentieth century was characterized by both rapid growth and an increasing emphasis on realism, sometimes influenced by the Second Hawaiian Renaissance and the Hawaiian sovereignty movement.

List of Hawaii authors

Noelani Arista
Robert Barclay, author of Hawaii Smiles
Alan Brennert, author of Moloka'i and Honolulu 
Marie Alohalani Brown
O. A. Bushnell, author of Ka'a'awa, The Return of Lono, and Molokai 
Lee Cataluna
Eric Chock
Kiana Davenport
Gavan Daws
Darlaine Mahealani Dudoit, founder of 'Oiwi: A Native Hawaiian Journal
Glen Grant
Kaui Hart Hemmings, author of The Descendants
John Dominis Holt IV, author of Waimea Summer, Princess of the Night Rides, On Being Hawaiian and Recollections
Garrett Hongo
ku'ualoha ho'omanawanui, co-founder of 'Oiwi: A Native Hawaiian Journal
George Kahumoku, Jr.
Matthew Kaopio
Lopaka Kapanui, author of Haunted Hawaiian Nights and The Legend of Morgan's Corner
Nora Okja Keller
Maxine Hong Kingston
Juliet Kono
R. Zamora Linmark, author of Rolling the R's
Darrell H. Y. Lum
Wing Tek Lum
Chris McKinney, author of The Tattoo, Mililani Mauka, and Boi No Good
Ian MacMillan, author of The Red Wind
Susanna Moore
Rodney Morales, author of When the Shark Bites
Milton Murayama
Ingrid Naiman
Barack Obama
Gary Pak
Mark Panek, author of Hawai'i: A Novel
Lehua Parker, author of Niuhi Shark Series
Mary Kawena Pukui
Shawna Yang Ryan
Noenoe Silva
Cathy Song
Lee Tonouchi
Haunani-Kay Trask
Kirby Wright
Lois-Ann Yamanaka

List of literary magazines
Bamboo Ridge
'Oiwi: A Native Hawaiian Journal

References

 
Literature